The Lancer 25 Mark V is an American trailerable sailboat that was designed by W. Shad Turner as a cruiser and first built in 1983.

The Lancer 25 Mark V is a development of the Lancer 25.

The Lancer 25 PS is a motorsailer design with a new hull shape from the Lancer 25 Mark V.

Production
The design was built by the Lancer Yacht Corp in the United States, starting in 1983, but it is now out of production.

Design
The Lancer 25 Mark V is a recreational keelboat, built predominantly of fiberglass, with wood trim. It has a fractional sloop rig, a raked stem, an angled transom, an internally mounted spade-type rudder controlled by a tiller and a fixed shoal draft fin keel. It displaces  and carries  of ballast.

The boat is normally fitted with a small outboard motor for docking and maneuvering.

The design has sleeping accommodation for five people, with a straight settee a berth and a drop-down dinette table double berth in the main cabin and two single aft cabins. The galley is located on both sides, just forward of the companionway ladder. The galley is equipped with a two-burner stove to port and a sink and ice box to starboard. The enclosed head is located in the forepeak.

See also
List of sailing boat types

Related development
Lancer 25

References

Keelboats
1980s sailboat type designs
Sailing yachts
Trailer sailers
Sailboat type designs by W. Shad Turner
Sailboat types built by Lancer Yachts